Niels Søndergaard (born 12 October 1947) is a Danish writer and translator.

In Denmark, Niels is one of the most active translator of sci/fi and fantasy books. He had translated influential books from English to Danish, including Dune by Frank Herbert, the Narnia saga of CS Lewis, Foundation series by Isaac Asimov, Earthsea trilogy by Ursula K. Le Guin and Shikasta by Doris Lessing and countless comics, including Calvin and Hobbes and the new translation of Tintin, movies and TV series.

As an author, he has written the original graphic novel Superman: A Tale of Five Cities which was drawn and colored by Teddy Kristiansen, the first and only Superman story ever originally produced outside the United States, and is the author of the series on Dimensionsdetektiven, designed by Ole Comoll Christensen in the same medium.

Niels Søndergaard received with Ole Comoll Christensen cartoon award Ping Prize in 1993.

References

1947 births
Living people
21st-century Danish translators